Charles de Solier, comte de Morette (1480 – 1 February 1552), the son of Aubertin de Solier, comte de Morette (1465–1545), was a French soldier and diplomat as well as a long-serving gentilhomme de la chambre to Francis I. He acted as ambassador to England on a number of occasions from October 1526 to June 1535.  Morette was in London in 1534 when Henry VIII was attempting to win French support for his repudiation of Catherine of Aragon, in an alliance against Holy Roman Emperor Charles V. Around this time, his portrait was painted by Hans Holbein the Younger. Holbein had also painted The Ambassadors, which depicted two French envoys, Jean de Dinteville, seigneur de Polisy, and Georges de Selve, Bishop of Lavaur, in 1533. He was succeeded as ambassador by Antoine de Castelnau, Bishop of Tarbes.

Marriages and issue
Morette married twice.
He married as his first wife, Silvie de Pont (1480–) and the couple had three sons:
 François de Solier, comte de Morette (1495–1541)
 Charles de Solier (c. 1500 – 1525)
 Jacques de Solier (1500–1551)
He married as his second wife, Lucie Valles and by her had a daughter:
 Marie de Solier (1520–)

He died 1 February 1552 at Le Plessis les Tours and was buried at the Église Saint-Grégoire des Minimes, Tours.

Footnotes

Sources

External links

 Charles de Solier Family tree
 

1480 births
1552 deaths
Ambassadors of France to England
16th-century French diplomats
Counts of France